Jessica Bérubé (born November 24, 1992) is a Canadian baseball pitcher from Quebec. She is a member of the Canada women's national baseball team which won a silver medal at the 2015 Pan American Games.

She plays for the Haute-Saint-Charles Pirates of the Quebec Junior Major Baseball League (French: Ligue de baseball junior majeur du Québec).

References

External links 
 

Sportspeople from Quebec City
Baseball pitchers
Canadian female baseball players
1992 births
Living people
Baseball players at the 2015 Pan American Games
Pan American Games silver medalists for Canada
Pan American Games medalists in baseball
Medalists at the 2015 Pan American Games